Impatiens ecornuta, the spurless touch-me-not or western touch-me-not, is an annual flowering plant native to the northwestern United States and British Columbia in Canada.

The name of the species was changed in 2012 as Impatiens ecalcarata was found to be nomen illegitimum.

References

ecornuta
Flora of Washington (state)
Flora of British Columbia
Flora without expected TNC conservation status